Bún chả is a Vietnamese dish of grilled pork and noodles, which is thought to have originated from Hanoi, Vietnam. Bún chả is served with grilled fatty pork (chả) over a plate of white rice noodles (bún) and herbs with a side dish of dipping sauce. The dish was described in 1959 by Vietnamese food writer Vu Bang (1913–1984), who described Hanoi as a town "transfixed by bún chả." Hanoi's first bún chả restaurant was on Gia Ngư, Hoàn Kiếm District, in Hanoi's Old Quarter.

Bún chả originated from and remains very popular in Hanoi and throughout Vietnam. Although it is a common misconception among non-Vietnamese diners that bún chả is related to the Southern Vietnam dish of vermicelli and grilled skewered pork called bún thịt nướng, the two dishes are completely distinct in both culinary history and cultural perception.

Bún Chả Hương Liên restaurant in Hanoi became famous after United States President Barack Obama dined there with Chef Anthony Bourdain while he was on his trip to Vietnam in May 2016.

Ingredients 

Bún chả is made up of many ingredients, which include:
 Meat: minced pork shoulder to make meatballs, pork belly.
 Rice vermicelli
 Dipping sauce: diluted fish sauce with sugar, lemon juice, vinegar, stock, crushed garlic, chilli, etc.
 Pickled vegetables: green papaya (or carrots, onion, kohlrabi).
 Fresh herbs: cabbage, Láng basil, rice paddy herb (ngổ), beansprout, Vietnamese balm (kinh giới).
 Side dishes: crushed garlic, crushed chilli, vinegar, ground pepper, sliced limes.

Bún chả in Hanoi

In Hanoi, bún chả is almost always eaten for lunch. This is a unique feature of Hanoi's culinary culture, as the dish is often served at all hours in other parts of Vietnam. Of course, nowadays, even in Hanoi there are restaurants that serve the dish in the evening.

See also
Bún thịt nướng
Rice noodles

References

External links
Weekend delicacies: Bún chả Hanoi

Vietnamese words and phrases
Vietnamese noodle dishes
Street food in Vietnam
Vietnamese pork dishes